Cape Arago State Park is a state park in the U.S. state of Oregon, administered by the Oregon Parks and Recreation Department.  Cape Arago is north of Bandon and 15 miles southwest of Coos Bay on Cape Arago Highway in Coos County.

History
In 1579, Sir Francis Drake is purported to have sought shelter for his ship, the Golden Hind, around Cape Arago. The headland was originally named Cape Gregory by James Cook on March 12, 1778 after Saint Gregory, the saint of that day; it was renamed Cape Arago after François Arago.

See also
 Cape Arago Light
 Cape Arago Highway No. 240
 List of Oregon state parks

References

External links
 

State parks of Oregon
Parks in Coos County, Oregon